Zugló is the official name of the 14th district of Budapest, the capital of Hungary. It is a large and mixed neighborhood, with communist era style highrise apartments sprinkled between decently kept one house residential streets. Városliget, the City Park is located at the western part of the district. Its popularity comes from the fact that it has leafy suburb style neighbourhoods closest to the city center.

Geography
 Area 18.15 km2
 Inhabitants: 130,000

Access to the district is easy; the southern end is easily accessible with the main M2 subway line, with its terminal station being the largest hub in the city at the border with Kőbánya. The northern part is accessible with the old M1 subway line.

History
Parts of Rákosmező is thought to be part of Zugló now; this was the ground for the inaugurational process for the king at times in Hungarian history dating back to the 13th century. The development of the area started in the middle of the 19th century as Pest expanded. The subway (the first subway in continental Europe outside London) reached the district at the end of the 19th century. The first mansions were built around the City Park.

As the city expanded, the suburban district quickly found itself fairly central in the city, and larger houses started to appear in certain areas. The Communist era brought large developments of pre-fab housing projects into some areas of the district, but large parts of the district still maintain the suburban feeling; and some areas even retained the glamour of the mansions built at the turn of the century.

Demographics
Zugló is considered to be amongst the 'nicest' and safest districts of the Pest side of the city, which also means that in most areas of the district, people are somewhat better off than the average of their class, meaning the block buildings are cleaner, houses are nicer, etc.

Zugló is a mixture of middle and working-class people. Occasionally non-European immigrants can also be seen in Zugló. The district is favored for its good transportation, safety and for being clean as well.

The district sees considerable new development of condos and is a favorite destination of young middle-class families.

Education
 Váci Mihály Kollégium

Sport
Budapesti AK (football)
BVSC Budapest (football)
BVSC (men's water polo)
Budapesti Postás SE, sports team
Turul FC, defunct football team
Zuglói AC, defunct football team
Zuglói SE, defunct football team

List of mayors

Gallery

Sightseeing
 Városliget (City Park) is located in Zugló, with a number of museums and attractions.

Notable people
 László Schell, grew up in Zugló.

See also
 List of districts in Budapest

References

External links

 Web pages of the district council (in Hungarian)
 Aerial photographs of Zugló